In phonetics, schwa is the mid central vowel (transcribed ) or similar neutral vowel.

Schwa may also refer to:

Typography and writing
Schwa (Cyrillic), a letter of some Cyrillic-based alphabets
Ə, a letter used in some Latin-derived alphabets
Shva or shĕwa, a Hebrew diacritic

Other uses
 Schwa (art), an underground conceptual artwork of Bill Barker
 Schwa (restaurant), an eatery in Chicago, Illinois, United States
 Shwa, an American singer–songwriter